The Cripavirus internal ribosome entry site (CrPV IRES) is an RNA element required for the production of capsid proteins through ribosome recruitment to an intergenic region IRES (IGR IRES).

See also 
 Cricket paralysis virus
 Internal ribosome entry site (IRES)

References

External links 

Cis-regulatory RNA elements
Dicistroviridae